Pawan Kumar Chamling (born 22 September 1949) is an Indian politician and writer serving as the 5th Chief Minister of Sikkim from 1994 to 2019.He was the longest serving Chief Minister of Sikkim and India,surpassing Jyoti Basu. Chamling is the Founding President of the Sikkim Democratic FrontHe also served as the Leader of the opposition,Sikkim Legislative Assembly from 2019 to 2019.He represents the Namchi-Singhithang constituency in the Sikkim Legislative Assembly since 2019 and the Damthang constituency from 1985 to 1994.Prior to establishing the Sikkim Democratic Front, Chamling served as Minister for Industries, Information and Public Relations from 1989 to 1992 in Nar Bahadur Bhandari's cabinet.

Personal life

Chamling was born in Yangang, South Sikkim to Nepali parents Ash Bahadur Chamling and Asha Rani Chamling. Chamling is also a prolific Nepali language writer, and recipient of the Bhanu Puraskar (2010) awarded by Sikkim Sahitya Parishad. He writes under the pen name Pawan Chamling. Mr. Chamling has two wives and 8 children (4 sons and 4 daughters).

Political career

Chamling was elected as the president of Yangang Gram Panchayat in 1982. In 1985, he was elected to the Sikkim Legislative Assembly for the first time. After being elected for the second time from Damthang, he became the Minister for Industries, Information and Public Relations from 1989 to 1992 in the Nar Bahadur Bhandari cabinet. After a series of major political upheavals in Sikkim, Chamling formed the Sikkim Democratic Front on 4 March 1993.

Chamling is the second chief minister in India after Jyoti Basu, of West Bengal to govern a state five terms in a row, with his party Sikkim Democratic Front winning the 1994, 1999, 2004, 2009 and 2014 Sikkim Legislative Assembly elections. His party first came to power in Sikkim after winning the 1994 Sikkim assembly elections. His popularity kept soaring in Sikkim due to his developmental work and for maintaining peace. In 2009, his party Sikkim Democratic Front won all 32 assembly seats in Sikkim Legislative Assembly.

In 2012, he faced allegations of corruption and Bhandari, his predecessor as CM, predicted that Chamling would go to jail if he lost his power.  And his former comrade Tamang (Golay) developed differences with him and floated his own party. These developments created political challenge for him, but he managed to win the assembly elections of 2014, albeit with a much reduced majority. 

Following win in 2014 assembly election, he was sworn in as the Chief Minister of Sikkim for the fifth consecutive time on 21 May 2014 by Shriniwas Dadasaheb Patil, the Governor of Sikkim. He became the chief minister for a fifth time, a record previously held by Jyoti Basu who ruled West Bengal from 1977 to 2000.

His party SDF won 22 out of 32 assembly seats in the 2014 legislative assembly election. 18 months after the  2014 elections, on 30 November 2015, 7 out of 10 opposition MLAs joined the SDF party under the leadership of Pawan Chamling. The ruling front had 29 out of 32 assembly seats in the state.

Chamling resigned as CM after 2019 Sikkim Legislative Assembly election as former member Prem Singh Tamang's Sikkim Krantikari Morcha party formed the  government by winning 17 seats out of 32. SDF party won the remaining 15 seats. But in August 2019, 10 MLAs quit his party to join Bharatiya Janata Party and in the same month two other legislators joined Sikkim Krantikari Morcha. Thus making Chamling only MLA of the party.

Electoral records 
 Sikkim Legislative Assembly election

See also 

 List of longest-serving Indian chief ministers
 List of chief ministers of Sikkim

References

External links

|-

1949 births
Living people
Chief Ministers of Sikkim
Sikkim Democratic Front politicians
People from Namchi district
Indian Gorkhas
Nepali-language poets
Indian National Congress politicians from Sikkim
Sikkim MLAs 2019–2024
Indian Hindus
Sikkim MLAs 1985–1989
Sikkim MLAs 1989–1994
Sikkim MLAs 1994–1999
Sikkim MLAs 1999–2004
Sikkim MLAs 2004–2009
Sikkim MLAs 2009–2014
Sikkim MLAs 2014–2019
Rai people